William Edwin Baker (June 19, 1931 – August 12, 1978) was an American NASCAR driver from Pismo Beach, California.  He made three Winston Cup starts with a best finish of 16th.  Following a practice run for a 100-mile Grand National West Series race at Sears Point Raceway, Baker suffered a fatal heart attack.

References

External links

1931 births
1978 deaths
People from Pismo Beach, California
Racing drivers from California
NASCAR drivers